Hugh O'Donnell may refer to:

 Hugh O'Donnell (politician) (born 1952), Scottish politician
 Hugh O'Donnell (footballer) (1913–1965), Scottish professional footballer
 Hugh O'Donnell (artist) (born 1950), English painter and printmaker
 Hugh O'Donnell (labor leader) (1869–?), American leader of the Homestead Steel Strike of 1892
 Hugh O'Donnell (priest) (1884–1947), American priest and President of the University of Notre Dame
 Hugh Roe O'Donnell (died 1505), ruler of Tyrconnell
 Hugh Roe O'Donnell (1572–1602), Prince of Tyrconnell
 Sir Hugh O'Donnell (died c. 1600), Irish Gaelic lord
 Hugh Dubh O'Donnell (died 1618), Irish Gaelic lord
 Hugh O'Donnell, 2nd Earl of Tyrconnell (1606–1642), titular King of Tír Conaill
 Hugh Duff O'Donnell (died 1537), leading figure in Gaelic Ireland during the Tudor era